Greatest Hits… And Then Some may refer to:
Greatest Hits… And Then Some (Aaron Tippin album), 1997
Greatest Hits… And Then Some (The Wilkinsons album), 2008